was a private junior college in Higashiomi, Shiga, Japan. It was originally established in 1990 as a junior women's college and became coeducational in 1997.

External links
 Official website 

Educational institutions established in 1990
Private universities and colleges in Japan
Universities and colleges in Shiga Prefecture
Japanese junior colleges
1990 establishments in Japan